Goldscheider is a German surname. Notable people with the surname include:

Alfred Goldscheider (1858–1935), German neurologist
Friedrich Goldscheider (1845–1897), Austrian manufacturer of the Goldscheider ceramics
Ludwig Goldscheider (1896–1973), Austrian-English art historian
Alexander Goldscheider (born 1950), Czech composer and music producer

German-language surnames
Jewish surnames
Yiddish-language surnames